Daly or DALY may refer to:

Places

Australia
 County of Daly, a cadastral division in South Australia
 Daly River, Northern Territory, a locality 
 Electoral division of Daly, an electorate in the Northern Territory
 Daly, Northern Territory, a locality

Elsewhere
 Daly (lunar crater), a crater on the Moon
 Daly (Martian crater), a crater on Mars
 Daly, Russia, a village (selo) in the Sakha Republic, Russia
 Daly City, California, United States
 Rural Municipality of Daly, Manitoba, Canada
 Daly College, India
 Daly Range, Greenland

People

Given name
 Daly Cherry-Evans (born 1989), Australian Rugby League player
 Daly Santana (born 1995), Puerto Rican indoor volleyball player

Surname
 Daly (surname)

Other uses
 Daly detector, a type of mass spectrometry detector
 Daly languages, group of Australian aboriginal languages
 Disability-adjusted life year (DALY), a measure of burden of disease
 USS Daly (DD-519), a Fletcher-class destroyer

See also
 Daily (disambiguation)
 Dailey, surname
 Daley (disambiguation)
 Dealey (disambiguation)
 Daly Waters (disambiguation)
 Douglas-Daly (disambiguation)
 Justice Daly (disambiguation)

English-language unisex given names